Dharmapatni ( Wife) is a 1987 Telugu-language drama film, produced by CKR Prasad, CRR Prasad under the Satya Shakti Pictures banner and directed by Tatineni Prasad. It stars Suman, Bhanupriya, Rajendra Prasad  and music composed by Chakravarthy. The film was a remake of the Tamil film Dharma Pathini (1986) and was remade in Hindi as Jawab Hum Denge (1987).

Plot
Inspector Prasanna (Suman) is a sincere police officer who can't bear activities of anti-social evildoers. Prasanna fell in love with his sub-inspector Vidya (Bhanu Priya). D. J. (Tatineni Prasad), a local rowdy, is the right hand to ex-minister Narasimha Murthy (Nutan Prasad). Hence an issue arises between Prasanna and D. J. on grabbing the land of labor. Bose Babu (Rajendra Prasad) is a union leader of the labor, brother-in-law to Vidya opposes D. J. Narasimha Murthy, with his political influence, implicates Bose Babu in a murder case. The rest of the story is how Prasanna & Vidya faced Narasimha Murthy and saved Bose Babu.

Cast
Suman as Inspector Prasanna
Bhanupriya as S.I. Vidya
Rajendra Prasad as Bosu Babu
Nutan Prasad as Narasimha Murthy
Allu Ramalingaiah as Linga Murthy
Mikkilineni
Tatineni Prasad as D. J.
Suthi Velu as Lawyer Madhusudhana Rao
Raavi Kondala Rao as Lawyer Dakshina Rao
Narra Venkateswara Rao as Samba Murthy 
Jagga Rao
Rajyalakshmi as Prameela
Anuradha as item number

Soundtrack

Music composed by Chakravarthy. Lyrics were written by Veturi. Music released on AVM Audio Company.

References

External links

Indian action drama films
Telugu remakes of Tamil films
Films scored by K. Chakravarthy
1980s Telugu-language films
Films directed by T. L. V. Prasad
1987 action films
1987 films